Whitmore is a civil parish in the district of Newcastle-under-Lyme, Staffordshire, England.  It contains 28 listed buildings that are recorded in the National Heritage List for England.  Of these, one is listed at Grade I, the highest of the three grades, four are at Grade II*, the middle grade, and the others are at Grade II, the lowest grade.  The parish contains the village of Whitmore and the surrounding area.  Most of the listed buildings are houses, cottages, farmhouses, and farm buildings.  The other listed buildings include two churches, memorials in a churchyard, a country house with associated structures, the ruins of a former manor house, and five mileposts.


Key

Buildings

References

Citations

Sources

Lists of listed buildings in Staffordshire
Borough of Newcastle-under-Lyme